The Chinese language involves a number of spoken exclamative words and written onomatopoeia which are used in everyday speech and informal writing. Such "exclamations" have their own Chinese character, but they are rarely used in formal written documents. Rather, they are found in movie subtitles, music lyrics, informal literature and on internet forums.

Many exclamatives contain the 口 mouth radical.

Use of exclamative particles
Exclamative particles are used as a method of recording aspects of human speech which may not be based entirely on meaning and definition. Specific characters are used to record exclamations, as with any other form of Chinese vocabulary, some characters exclusively representing the expression (such as 哼), others sharing characters with alternate words and meanings (such as 可). As with all Chinese characters, exclamative particles span only one syllable, and are formed in the same structure as other Chinese words (for example, words in Mandarin Chinese only end in -n, -ng, -r or a vowel).

The mouth radical 口 found on many exclamative particles represents that the character is a sound, as with onomatopoeia and speech-related words, since phono-semantic compound subset of Chinese characters are classified through meaning by their radicals. For example, 嘿 hei is derived from the mouth radical 口 and the character 黑 hei, which literally means "black", while 啞 originates from the mouth radical plus the character 亞 ya, meaning Asia. The practice occurs from adding a radical in front of a same or similar-sounding word, which then introduces a new word with a new meaning, depending on the radical. Most words represented by the mouth radical have something to do with sounds or speech.

Use of exclamative particles is highly informal, and it is advised that they not be used in formal documents or academic papers, unless it is specifically required to do so (such as the case of narrative telling).

While such exclamations are used in subtitles and descriptions of speech, usage is also popular in social circumstances, such as in text messaging, IM and blogs, where the formality of text is not an issue. Peers may use such particles to address and communicate with each other, just as people in English-speaking regions use words such as "Hey!" to address close friends, or use words like "ugh" or "argh" while online, which are also considered to be informal.

Parallels in other East Asian languages
Similarly in Japanese, particles are used to add expression to speech (e.g. よ, an exclamatory particle), however particles are used more thoroughly and frequently in Japanese than in Chinese. Some Japanese particles are also more commonly used within informal written texts than their Chinese counterparts.

Exclamative particles are also used in the Korean language, such as the use of 에 (e) to represent surprise, although such usage is also considered informal.

List of Chinese exclamations

See also 
 Chinese pronouns
 Chinese grammar
 Chinese language
 Japanese sound symbolism

References

External links
金山词霸 Dictionary
Dict.CN 海词 在线词典

Chinese characters
Interjections
Interjections by language